The 2010 Oklahoma State Cowboys football team represented Oklahoma State University in the 2010 NCAA Division I FBS football season. The team was coached by sixth-year head coach Mike Gundy and played their homes game at Boone Pickens Stadium. They played in the Big 12 Conference in the South Division. They finished the year with an 11–2 record (6–2 Big 12) and a 36–10 victory over Arizona in the Alamo Bowl.  Along the way, the Cowboys set a new school record for wins in a season, with 11.  It was also the fourth 10-win season in the Cowboys' 110-year football history; the others came in 1984, 1987 and 1988.

Schedule

Game summaries

Washington State

Troy

Tulsa

Texas A&M

Louisiana–Lafayette

Texas Tech

Nebraska

Kansas State

Baylor

Texas

Kansas

Oklahoma

Arizona

Rankings

References

Oklahoma State
Oklahoma State Cowboys football seasons
Alamo Bowl champion seasons
Oklahoma State Cowboys football